South Park is a small urban park and eponymous neighborhood in the larger South of Market neighborhood of San Francisco, California, consisting of 0.85 acres (0.34 ha) of public ground. The neighborhood centers on the small, oval-shaped park and South Park Street, which encircles the park. South Park is bounded by Second, Third, Bryant, and Brannan streets.

The two halves of the South Park Street re-join at both ends of the park and continue for short, straight stretches before terminating at Second Street on one end and Third Street on the other. This creates a curved line of buildings, which gives the street and park an unusual enclosed, urban character. Local businesses, restaurants and many apartment buildings dot the street.

In January 2016, the park was closed temporarily in order to undergo a $2.8 million renovation, which will include comprehensive infrastructural and cosmetic upgrades.

History

The South Park block was assembled in 1852 by English entrepreneur George Gordon.

The park was originally constructed in 1855 as the center of an exclusive residential community. It was modeled after a square in London, England, as a housing development of seventeen mansions plus townhouses (a total of 58 residences) on a 550-foot oval around a private grassy park.  It featured the first paved streets and sidewalks in San Francisco.  A windmill in the center of the park pumped water for the houses.

On January 2, 1895, during the settlement movement era, the South Park Settlement at Number 15 South Park was established by the San Francisco Settlement Association. From the late 19th to the early 20th century, South Park was also the center of one of San Francisco's largest Japanese American communities. Sandwiched between the waterfront and the South Pacific Railroad terminus, the area featured Japanese owned and operated hostels, hotels, baths, and shops. Many of the structures remain: the Madrid Hotel occupies what once was the Eimoto Hotel at 22 South Park.

The neighborhood began to lose exclusivity after the construction of Second Street, which made the area accessible to less affluent residents.  Rich residents moved to the newer Nob Hill neighborhood in the late 19th century, and the city took over the park in 1897. It suffered further decline after the San Francisco earthquake of 1906, when most of the homes around the Rincon Hill neighborhood were destroyed. The oval park, however, has remained unchanged and is still a central meeting place in the neighborhood.  After the quake, the neighborhood was rebuilt as warehouses, light manufacturing, nightclubs, and hotels.  Immigrants from various countries came to the neighborhood, as well as longshoremen, drug addicts, and vagrants.  The neighborhood began to attract artists and young professionals beginning in the 1970s.

The area flourished during the dot-com boom of the late 1990s, due to flexible office space at initially low rent.  It was sometimes described as "ground zero" of the dot com revolution, with many start-up Internet companies based in the area. By late 2001, however, many of these companies had closed their doors. Yet, as of 2006, in an era for the Internet that some have dubbed Web 2.0, South Park has once again become home to many small Web-related companies.

Recently, some neighbors in South Park have expressed opposition to a proposal to put an above-ground stop on the Central Subway at the southwestern end of South Park Street, on Third Street. Finally the routing of the line has been decided by the Municipal Transportation Agency, and will be along Fourth Street, one block farther west.

South Park businesses

Current 

(as of January 2016)

Architecture, engineering and design
Aidlin Darling Design
Arcanum Architecture
Blue Clover Devices
CMG Landscape Architecture
Fennie + Mehl Architects
Levy Design Partners
Mark Horton / Architecture
Pfau Long Architecture
Sand Studios
Strandberg Engineering
Valerio Dewalt Train Associates
WRNS Studio
Zack | de Vito Architecture + Construction
zero ten design

Arts and culture
Lamplighters Music Theatre, nonprofit music theater company
Gallery 16, contemporary art gallery

Food and beverage
Blue Bottle Coffee
Caffe Centro, coffeehouse
HRD, Asian fusion restaurant
Small Foods, cafe and "grab and go" grocery store
South Park Cafe

Media and web
Alternet (Independent Media Institute), journalism website
Apartment List
Macworld
PC World
R/GA
SFist
Tendo Communications, marketing communications,
Wired, tech magazine

Technology
1BOG, One Block Off the Grid, clean-tech solar 
AxleHire, integrated logistics provider
Dropbox, web-based file hosting service 
Fantasy Interactive, full service digital agency
 Foxcove, IT Services Firm
Flowcast, fintech company
Grid Net, WiMAX based power meters
TravelBank, travel expense management
Tune, mobile marketing firm
iOffer, Social marketplace
Olark, live chat provider
Okta, Internet identity and access management provider
Presence, Digital Product (web, mobile, XR) development and strategy
Prowl, music discovery
Sauce Labs
Slideshare.net, a slide hosting service
Splunk, software company
Strava, Athlete GPS tracking and analysis
Rubicon Project, advertising automation
Wcities

Venture capital
Accel
Coatue
GGV Capital
Genoa Ventures
GV
Kleiner Perkins
Norwest Venture Partners
Redpoint Ventures
Singtel Innov8
Vertex Ventures US

Former

Adaptive Path, Web consulting
Bigwords.com, used textbooks
Cumulus Networks, creators of Cumulus Linux, a network operating system 
DigaCast, Digital Music.(recapitalized in 2008)
Dipity, Web-based Digital Timelines 
Engine Yard, Platform as a Service
frog design inc., design consultancy
Fuseproject, product design and branding studio that designed new Mini, founded by Yves Behar
FutureAdvisor, A digital investment advisor that optimizes all of your investment accounts automatically.
Get Satisfaction, web-based customer support
Grockit, Web-based collaborative learning platform
Hummer Winblad, Venture Capital firm
Lookout Mobile Security
LookSmart, online advertising
Lumosity, Brain fitness
Mashape, Cloud API Hub
Mule Design Studio, Web design
Obvious Corp., blog-related company, acquired by Odeo.
Odeo, podcasting
Organic, Inc., formerly in same building as Wired Magazine.
Quokka Sports, on-line sports coverage
PeerSpace, short-term work space marketplace
Podshow, podcasting
Prismatic, social discovery,
Rubyred Labs, Web applications
 Sherman Clay (Steinway distributorship), now rented out to dot com companies
Socialcast, Enterprise social software developer
Slide.com, Widget software maker (moved when acquired by Google)
Sputnik Integrated, web design and development 
Technorati, blogging
Twistage, video workflow
Twitter, micro blogging
VerticalResponse, direct marketing
Wikimedia Foundation
Xoom Corporation, money transfer
YouNoodle, innovation data analytics company

Neighbors
South Park is located between the San Francisco–Oakland Bay Bridge (Interstate 80) and Oracle Park, the city's baseball stadium. Many of the nearby streets are one-way, and many carry traffic to and from the bridge, the stadium, and Interstate 280, which terminates slightly to the south of the neighborhood.

Oracle Park (formerly Pacific Bell Park, then SBC Park, then AT&T Park), where the San Francisco Giants major league baseball team plays, is two blocks south and east of South Park.

References

External links

San Francisco Chronicle article As Wikipedia moves to S.F., founder discusses planned changes published November 30, 2007 says "Wikipedia [...] has found office space in the city's South Park neighborhood."
The San Francisco Block Book (1901) p. 332 showing "100 Vara Block 359" (South Park)
more recent Block Book page from the County Recorder-Assessor's Office showing Block 3775 (formerly 100 Vara Block 359, i.e., South Park)

Parks in San Francisco
Neighborhoods in San Francisco
South of Market, San Francisco